Gastric pacing is the process where a pacemaker is placed external to the stomach, and leads penetrate the gastric tissue to ensure that an adequate current is running through the cells. It is used as a treatment for gastroparesis.

References

Digestive system procedures